Dahuiyeh (also Romanized as Dāhū’īyeh and Dahoo’eyeh; also known as Dahu and Rāhū’īyeh) is a village in Eslamabad Rural District, in the Central District of Zarand County, Kerman Province, Iran. At the 2006 census, its population was 738, in 189 families.

References 

Populated places in Zarand County